Free Function may refer to

 an Uninterpreted function in mathematics,
 a non-member function in the C++ programming language.